Making Money is a fantasy novel by British writer Terry Pratchett, part of his  Discworld series, first published in the UK on 20 September 2007. It is the second novel featuring Moist von Lipwig, and involves the Ankh-Morpork mint and specifically the introduction of paper money to the city. The novel won the Locus Award for Best Fantasy Novel in 2008, and was nominated for the Nebula Award the same year.

Plot
Moist von Lipwig is bored with his job as the Postmaster General of the Ankh-Morpork Post Office, which is running smoothly without any challenges, so the Patrician tries to persuade him to take over the Royal Bank of Ankh-Morpork and the Royal Mint. Moist, though bored, is content with his new lifestyle, and refuses. However, when the current chairwoman, Topsy Lavish, dies, she leaves 50% of the shares in the bank to her dog, Mr Fusspot (who already owns one share of the bank, giving him a majority and making him chairman), and she leaves the dog to Moist. She also made sure that the Assassins' Guild would fulfill a contract on Moist if anything unnatural happens to the dog or he does not do as her last will commands.

With no alternatives, Moist takes over the bank and finds out that people do not trust banks much, that the production of money runs slowly and at a loss, and that people now use stamps as currency rather than coins. His various ambitious changes include making money that is not backed by gold but by the city itself. Unfortunately, neither the chief cashier (Mr. Bent, who is rumoured to be a vampire but is actually something much worse, a clown) nor the Lavish family are too happy with him and try to dispose of him. Cosmo Lavish tries to go one step further — he attempts to replace Vetinari by taking on his identity — with little success; to this end, he tasks his secretary Heretofore (who he frequents calls 'Drumknot', Vetinari's secretary) with acquiring Vetinari's personal effects (many of them, in fact, being fakes, with Heretofore having pocketed most of the expenses he 'required' to obtain them).

His position at the Bank comes from being Topsy Lavish's nephew, and has allowed him to build the Glooper — a water-based "thinking machine" for economic modelling. All the while, the reappearance of Cribbins, a character from von Lipwig's past who poses as an Omnian priest, adds more pressure to his unfortunate scenario.

Moist's fiancée, Adora Belle Dearheart, is working with the Golem Trust in the meantime to uncover golems from the ancient civilization of Um. She succeeds in bringing them to the city, and to everyone's surprise the "four golden golems" turn out to be "four thousand golems" (due to a translation error) and so the city is at risk of being at war with other cities who might find an army of 4000 golems threatening. Moist discovers the secret to controlling the golems, and manages to order them to bury themselves outside the city (except for a few to power clacks towers and golem horses for the mail coaches) and then decides that these extremely valuable golems are a much better foundation for the new currency than gold and thus introduces the golem-based currency. Eventually, an anonymous clacks message goes out to the leaders of other cities that contains the secret to controlling the golems (the wearing of a golden suit), thus making them unsuitable for use in warfare (as anyone could wear a shiny robe and countermand any orders).

After it is discovered that the bank's vaults do not in fact contain AM$10,000,000 worth of gold, Moist is arrested for embezzlement and a public inquiry is held. Whilst Moist pre-emptively reveals his past as a fraudster to undermine Cribbins's plans to blackmail him, Cosmo's sister Pucci unthinkingly reveals that the Lavish family sold off all of the bank's gold reserves years earlier, exonerating Moist. Cosmo, having been driven insane by an infection caused by 'Vetinari's' ill-fitting stygium signet ring, disrupts the inquiry by claiming that he is the real Vetinari. Moist manages to save Cosmo's life by exposing the ring to direct sunlight, which removes and cauterises his gangrenous finger.

At the end of the novel, Lord Vetinari considers the advancing age of the current Chief Tax Collector, and suggests that upon his retirement a new name to take on the vacancy might present itself. Cosmo has been confined to the Havelock Vetinari Wing of the Lady Sybil Free Hospital, whose patients are all deluded into believing that they are Lord Vetinari (including himself). And havoc ensues when Hubert attempts to manipulate Glooper into believing that there are ten million dollars worth of gold in the vaults.

Characters

Moist von Lipwig, Postmaster General and Vice Chairman of the Royal Bank of Ankh-Morpork.
Adora Belle Dearheart, fiancée of Moist and manager of the Golem Trust
Mr Fusspot, Chairman of the Bank
Lord Vetinari, Patrician
Mr Mavolio Bent, Chief Cashier of the Bank
Cosmo Lavish, a director of the Bank
Rev Cribbins, villain with impressive teeth

Themes

According to Pratchett, Making Money is both fantasy and non-fantasy, as money is a fantasy within the "real world", as "we've agreed that these numbers of conceptual things like dollars have a value".

Promotional items in the UK hardcover first edition
Some High Street booksellers have additional exclusive promotional material glued under the inside of the dust jacket:
Borders include an Ankh-Morpork cheque book
Waterstone's include a few Ankh-Morpork bank notes

Reception
Kim Newman, writing for The Independent, called the book "on-the-nose and up-to-the-minute in its subject", praising the villain and the narration. The Guardians Patrick Ness praised the book's humanity, and its "sharp questions (...) about why we trust banks (...) as well as the nature of money", but noted that the book "is not quite as successful as" Going Postal due to the lack of some of Going Postals forward drive. The Observers Rowland Manthrope was critical of the book, saying that "Pratchett has wit here, but has lost his normal cutting edge". Nick Rennison, from The Sunday Times, said that while "Making Money is not vintage Discworld", "it still offers more comic inventiveness and originality than most other novels of the year. And more fun."

References

External links

 

Discworld books
2007 British novels
2007 fantasy novels
British comedy novels
Doubleday (publisher) books